KPR Gwardia Opole is a professional men's handball team based in Opole in southern Poland, founded in 1945. The club plays in the Superliga.

Team

Current squad
Squad for the 2022–23 season

Goalkeepers
1  Jakub Ałaj
 12  Mateusz Lellek
 16  Adam Malcher

Left wingers
6  Maciej Fabianowicz
 22  Michał Milewski
 24  Michał Ścisłowicz
Right wingers
7  Mateusz Wojdan
 11  Marek Hryniewicz
Line players
 15  Paweł Stempin
 18  Mateusz Jankowski
 26  Łukasz Kucharzyk

Left backs
3  Noa Zubac
8  Antoni Łangowski
 10  Szymon Koc
 20  Wiktor Kawka
Centre backs
5  Fabian Sosna
 23  Mateusz Morawski
 35  Marek Monczka
Right backs
 17  Andrzej Widomski
 71  Roman Chychykalo

Transfers
Transfers for the 2022–23 season

  Joining
  Szymon Koc (LB) (from  SMS Kielce)
  Antoni Łangowski (LB) (from  Azoty-Puławy)
  Noa Zubac (LB) (on loan from  Łomża Industria Kielce)
  Roman Chychykalo (RB) (from  Zagłębie Lubin)
  Andrzej Widomski (RB) (from  SMS Płock)
  Marek Hryniewicz (RW) (from  SMS Płock)
  Mateusz Wojdan (RW) (from  Grupa Azoty Unia Tarnów)
  Paweł Stempin (P) (from  SMS Kielce)

 Leaving
  Paweł Kowalski (LB) (to  Piotrkowianin)
  Aleksei Solovev (CB) (to  HC Meshkov Brest)
  Maciej Zarzycki (CB) (to  Grand Nancy MHB)
  Miłosz Bączek (RB) (to  MKS Padwa Zamość)
  Przemysław Zadura (RB) (retires)
  Patryk Mauer (RW) (to  Górnik Zabrze)
  Filip Stefani (RW) (to  Stal Mielec)
  Eduard Klimenko (P) (to  HC Meshkov Brest)
  Jan Klimków (P) (to  Dunkerque HGL)

References

External links
 Official website 

Polish handball clubs
Sport in Opole
Handball clubs established in 1945
1945 establishments in Poland